eMobc is an open source framework for generation of web, mobile web and native IOS and Android apps develop mobile applications quickly and easily using XML. eMobc Framework is developed by Neurowork Consulting S.L. and was introduced in November 2012. eMobc currently supports the following platforms IOS, Android, and HML5. In the future is to add other platforms as BlackBerry or Windows Phone.

All the framework is published under the Affero GPLv3 license. Developers also can donate their code and integrate it with the eMobc framework.

Moreover, eMobc is the first framework with job board where developers can register and collaborate on client projects.

Features 

Included in the framework is support for 19 types of screens, with text, forms, maps, calendars, and more, for building applications. Various themes and styles are also supported so the appearance of each screen can be customized. Navigation created with eMobc can be configured with top, bottom, and sidebar menus. The framework also allows for screen rotation, text to speech, and social network sharing.

In addition, various formats support smartphones and tablets. Any components developed with the platform can be done so in the desired language. Numerous possibilities are provided for screens, including splash screens, a cover for the application with buttons, photo galleries, PDF viewing, lists, videos, and geolocation maps. Users can also add search, form, image with text, zoom, quiz, and canvas functions.

eMobc Cloud 

From eMobc Framework born eMobc Cloud platform for creating mobile web and landing pages in just three minutes. This project is currently in development and will be released in the coming months.

Advantages
 Multiplatform:- eMobc as of now underpins the accompanying local stages: iOS, Android and HTML5. Being open source don't hold up to make another stage. It is simple and basic utilizing the system.
 Client Server:-  The system permits mix with outer administrations. Through structures create dynamic route. Would you be able to envision conversing with an outside administration and have the capacity to produce the whole application on the fly? This is as of now conceivable with eMobc.
 Screens:- eMobc underpins 19 sorts of screens to construct your application. Screens with content, maps, structures, schedules and then some. Expands the structure and backings your new screen or utilize existing ones to give new usefulness to your applications.
 Offline Online:-The whole structure is equipped for both online and offline. Envision including your substance inside the cell phone to save money on data transmission or outsource your administrations to be dynamic and can expend the web or outer administrations. Along these lines you get a completely unique stage.

References 

1.eMobc, a multiplatform opensource framework made in Spain http://www.genbetadev.com/desarrollo-aplicaciones-moviles/emobc-un-framework-opensource-multiplataforma-hecho-en-espana . Published on 06/11/2012

2.Interview with Alejandro Sánchez Acosta, CEO of eMobc http://www.pabloyglesias.com/blog/entrevista-a-alejandro-sanchez-acosta-ceo-de-emobc/ Published on 10/12/12

3.eMobc project, framework for developing cross-platform native mobile apps http://wwwhatsnew.com/2012/11/15/proyecto-emobc-framework-para-el-desarrollo-de-aplicaciones-moviles-nativas-multiplataforma/ Published on 15/112012

4.Interesting made in Spain framework development for iOS and Android apps. https://web.archive.org/web/20121128013623/http://desarrolloweb.com/actualidad/emobc-crea-aplicaciones-moviles-usandoxml-7684.html Published on 23/11/2012

5.eMobc, an opensource Framework to generate native applications on Android, IOS and Webapps http://www.elandroidelibre.com/2012/11/emobc-un-framework-opensource-para-generar-aplicaciones-nativas-en-ios-y-android-webapps-y-web-mobile.html Published on 24/11/2012

6.eMobc, a multiplatform opensource framework made in Spain http://www.cenatic.es/hemeroteca-de-cenatic/3-sobre-el-sector-del-sfa/40144-emobc-un-framework-opensource-multiplataforma-hecho-en-espana- Published on 13/02/2013

References

External links 

Official Website
Apps using eMobc (http://emobc.com/home.php#cases)

Mobile software programming tools